David Konecny (born 10 October 1982) is a retired Czech male volleyball player. He was part of the Czech Republic men's national volleyball team at the 2010 FIVB Volleyball Men's World Championship in Italy. He played for Tours VB.

Clubs
 Tours VB (2010-2017)

References

External links
 

1982 births
Living people
Czech men's volleyball players
Place of birth missing (living people)
Tours Volley-Ball players